Antonio Rivera Rodríguez Airport  is a public airport on the island of Vieques in Puerto Rico. Because a large amount of Vieques's yearly revenue comes from the tourism industry, this airport plays an important part in the Vieques economy. For decades, the airport has been the hub of Vieques Air Link, and also a destination for a number of small airlines.

It is included in the National Plan of Integrated Airport Systems for 2011–2015, which categorized it as a primary commercial service airport (more than 10,000 enplanements per year).

History
When anti-military demonstrators started flocking into Vieques in 1999, Vieques Airport saw a considerable increase to its normal yearly average of passengers. In addition, many celebrities who travelled from all over Puerto Rico and the rest of Latin America to join the protesters arrived at Vieques through this airport. When Carla Tricoli, a Vieques native, won the 2002 Miss Puerto Rico contest, her first flight as a beauty queen landed at Vieques Airport.

The airport does not accept jet aircraft, but several international flights operate from it. Most of the commercial aviation operations are domestic flights such as to Ceiba, to Isla Grande Airport in San Juan, and to Luis Muñoz Marín International Airport in Carolina, a suburb of San Juan. Air ambulance flights to San Juan are also available.

Early in 2005, plans were announced to expand the airport's runway, so that the airport could accept flights by smaller jets. This would be done in preparation for American Eagle to start operations to the airport on behalf of American Airlines via a code sharing agreement. The airline was expected to start flights to Vieques from San Juan's Luis Muñoz Marín International Airport in early 2010; however, American Eagle decided not to begin service and then subsequently ceased all code sharing flights on behalf of American in the Caribbean.

Facilities

Airlines and destinations

Scheduled passenger service is provided by the following airlines:

Statistics

Accidents and incidents
 On December 19, 1977, a Britten-Norman BN-2 Islander operated by Vieques Air Link en route from St. Croix ditched off of Vieques due to fuel exhaustion. Five passengers of the 10 on board were killed.
 A Beechcraft A100 King Air which belonged to Padosa Productions-a musical label to which boy band Menudo belonged-crashed with 11 people on board, 2 crew members and nine passengers, on Wednesday, August 17, 1983. The plane was on a flight from Alexander Hamilton International Airport in St. Croix, U.S. Virgin Islands to Isla Verde International Airport in San Juan, with a stop-over at Vieques, when it confronted lifting problems on take-off from Vieques to San Juan, hitting citrus trees before it was able to stop. While there were no injuries reported, the airplane suffered substantial damage. It is unknown whether band director Edgardo Diaz or any of the band's members at the time (Johnny Lozada, Ricky Melendez, Charlie Masso, Ray Reyes and Roy Rossello) were in the plane when it crashed. 
 Vieques Air Link Flight 901A – On August 2, 1984, a BN-2 Islander of Vieques Air Link crashed after take-off, killing all nine passengers and crew.

See also

 Transport in Puerto Rico
 List of airports in Puerto Rico

References

External links
 
 
 Antonio Rivera Rodriguez Airport

Vieques, Puerto Rico
Airports in Puerto Rico